Peter Giles may refer to:

Peter Giles (born 1971), Canadian actor
Peter Giles (countertenor) (born 1939), British countertenor and voice teacher
Peter Giles (musician) (born 1944), British bass player and vocalist
Peter Giles (philologist) (1860–1935), philologist and Master of Emmanuel College, Cambridge
Peter Giles (canoeist) (born 1970), Canadian sprint kayaker
Peter Giles (footballer) (born 1958), Australian footballer

See also
Pieter Gillis (1486–1533), humanist and friend of Thomas More
Peter de Giles (1927–2015), British Olympic rower